Day, Summers and Company was a British steam locomotive manufacturer and shipbuilder in the Southampton area. The company's history is complex and involves five men: , John Thomas Groves, Charles Arthur Day, William Baldock and Nathaniel Ogle.

Forerunners
Summers and Ogle's 1830 patent, "Specification of William Alltoft Summers and Nathaniel Ogle: Steam-engine and Other Boilers" was published by the Queen's Print Office in 1854.

In around 1830 or 1831, Summers and Ogle, based at the Iron Foundry, Millbrook, Southampton, made two, three-wheeled steam carriages.

In 1831, Ogle gave evidence on the steam carriage to the "Select Committee of the House of Commons on Steam Carriages".

In 1832, one of the steam carriages travelled, via Oxford, to Birmingham and Liverpool.

A June 1833 newspaper report described a demonstration in London:

In 1834, two companies were founded at Millbrook. They were Summers, Day and Baldock and Summers, Groves and Day. In 1837, both companies moved to Northam, Southampton.

Day, Summers and Company

Groves left in 1845 and Baldock left in 1854. At some point the two companies merged and became Day, Summers and Company.

Its engines were generally of the Stephenson "Planet" type. A further  was built in 1839 for the London and Greenwich Railway. This was modified soon after delivery by the addition of a trailing axle making it .

Two more locomotives were built for the London and Southampton Railway and two for Bourne, Bartley and Company. Of the latter, one was sold on to the North Union Railway and the other to the Bolton and Leigh Railway. Both were withdrawn before 1846.

When the London and South Western Railway opened in 1838, Summers Grove and Day carried out much of its repair work into the 1850s, complementing Nine Elms Locomotive Works at the other end of the line.

Other new engines may have been built, but known surviving records are sparse.

References

 Lowe, J.W., (1989) British Steam Locomotive Builders, Guild Publishing

Defunct shipbuilding companies of England
Locomotive manufacturers of the United Kingdom
Steam road vehicles